The Nokia 3110 classic is a mobile phone handset, manufactured by Nokia in Hungary and released for sale in 2007. Although the phone bears the same model number as the 1997 Nokia 3110, it was not directly derived from (and has little similarity with) this model.

The Nokia 3110 classic is a "candybar" cameraphone which uses the Series 40 operating system and operates on GSM networks operating at 900 MHz, 1800 MHz, or 1900 MHz, supporting EDGE (Enhanced Data Rates for GSM Evolution) connections. In some regions the phone was marketed as the  Nokia 3110c, which is the same as the 3110 classic.

The phone also supports Bluetooth, FM radio, MP3, AAC and video playback, and supports microSD cards up to 2 GB.

The phone has large buttons in its keypad which make typing messages and e-mails easy. The 1.8-inch display supports a maximum display resolution of 128 × 160.

The Nokia 3109 classic has been released around the same time, but it's essentially the same model, sans the camera.

Technical specifications

References

External links

 Nokia 3110 Classic (Nokia UK)
 Nokia 3110c (Nokia China – link in Chinese)

3110 Classic
Mobile phones introduced in 2007
Mobile phones with infrared transmitter
Mobile phones with user-replaceable battery